Aprile is a 1998 Italian film. Aprile may also refer to:

Surname
Andrea Finocchiaro Aprile (1878–1964), Italian politician
Camillo Finocchiaro Aprile (1851–1916), Italian jurist and politician
Claudio Aprile (born 1969), Uruguayan-born Canadian chef
Elena Aprile (born 1954), Italian experimental particle physicist
Francesco Aprile (1657–1710), Italian sculptor and stucco artist
Giulia Aprile (born 1995), Italian middle-distance runner
Giuseppe Aprile (1731–1813), Italian castrato singer and music teacher
Gustavo Aprile (born 1988), Montevidean footballer
Johnny Aprile (born 1989), Canadian football player
Onata Aprile, American actress

First name
Aprile Millo (born 1958), American operatic soprano

Fictional characters
Don Raymonde Aprile from Mario Puzo's novel Omertà
Jackie Aprile Jr., son of Jackie Aprile Sr., from the TV series The Sopranos
Jackie Aprile Sr., from the TV series The Sopranos
Richie Aprile, older brother of Jackie Aprile Sr., from the TV series The Sopranos

Other
Aprile is the Italian name for the month of April
Entoloma aprile, a species of Entoloma

See also
April (disambiguation)